Eunice S. Chen (later Eunice Chen Buckland) is Utah’s first Asian American female lawyer. Chen was born in Hong Kong in 1946. She earned her Juris Doctor from the University of Utah Law School. On October 19, 1973, she was admitted as the first Asian American female to practice law in the state.

See also 

 List of first women lawyers and judges in Utah

References 

Living people
Utah lawyers
20th-century American women lawyers
20th-century American lawyers
University of Utah alumni
1946 births
21st-century American women lawyers
21st-century American lawyers